Sainte-Rose is a district in Laval, Quebec. It was incorporated as a village in 1850, and was a separate town until the municipal mergers on August 6, 1965 which amalgamated all the municipalities on Île Jésus into a single City of Laval.

Ste-Rose is best known for the parish church, erected 1740, which contains a Casavant Frères organ and hosts numerous concerts every year, and for "Vieux Ste-Rose", an area known for its old houses and its restaurants. Other districts that are also part of Sainte-Rose are Champenois (located between Boulevard Curé-Labelle and Autoroute 15, to the west of "Vieux Ste-Rose") and Champfleury, also known as Des Oiseaux (after the name of the district's main thoroughfare), to the south, near the border with Chomedey.

Transportation 

It is served by city bus lines operated by the Société de transport de Laval and by  commuter trains of the Saint-Jerome line of the Réseau de transport métropolitain (RTM). The Sainte-Rose station on that line is located just east of "Vieux Ste-Rose", on the border with Auteuil.

Geography 
Sainte-Rose is delimited on the north by the Rivière des Mille-Îles, on the west by Fabreville, on the north-east by Auteuil, on the south-east by Vimont and on the south by Chomedey.

Education
Commission scolaire de Laval operates French-language public schools.
 Écoles secondaire Curé-Antoine-Labelle
 École primaire Demers
 École primaire Des Cardinaux
 École primaire Du Parc
 École primaire L’Envolée
 École primaire L’Aquarelle
 École primaire Villemaire
 École primaire Le Baluchon (alternative school)

Sir Wilfrid Laurier School Board operates English-language public schools. All sections of Laval are zoned to Laval Junior Academy and Laval Senior Academy.

Trivia 
 Antoine Labelle, priest and proponent of the settlement of the Laurentians, was born and lived there. His house is classified as an historic building.
 It is also the birthplace of painter Marc-Aurèle Fortin.
 Les Patriotes of the Lower Canada Rebellion gathered at a hotel on a road that is known today as the "rue des Patriotes" (street of the Patriots).

References 

Sainte-Rose at the Commission de toponymie du Québec

External links

City of Laval, official website

Neighbourhoods in Laval, Quebec
Former municipalities in Quebec
Populated places disestablished in 1965
Canada geography articles needing translation from French Wikipedia